Laqaleh (also Romanized as Lāqal‘eh; also known as Lāqalā) is a village in Kalashi Rural District, Kalashi District, Javanrud County, Kermanshah Province, Iran. At the 2006 census, its population was 75, in 17 families.

References 

Populated places in Javanrud County